Than Nyunt Win is a Burmese politician who currently serves as Minister of Electricity, Technical, Road and Communication  for Sagaing Region and MP for Ye-U Township №.1.

Political career 
In the 2015 Myanmar general election, he was elected as a Sagaing Region Hluttaw MP, from Ye-U Township No.1 parliamentary constituency. He also serving as a Regional Minister of Electricity, Technical, Road and Communication for the Sagaing Region .

References

National League for Democracy politicians
Living people
People from Sagaing Region
Year of birth missing (living people)